2013 Isle of Man Festival of Motorcycling including the Manx Grand Prix and the Classic TT Races were held between Saturday 17 August and Friday 30 August 2013 on the 37.73-mile Mountain Course.

The rebranded festival by the Isle of Man Department of Economic Development and the Manx Motor Cycle Club (MMCC)  will included the Manx Grand Prix Races, the Manx Classic, the Manx Two Day Trials and the VMCC Manx Rally which will include the Festival of Jurby. The newly developed Festival will retain elements of the existing Manx Grand Prix Races, while also include the important Isle of Man TT brand in a new Classic TT, which will form part of a three-day classic meeting including a parade to celebrate the 90th Anniversary of the Manx Grand Prix.

Results

Practice Times

Race Results

Race 1; 500 cc Classic TT Race
Saturday 24 August 2013 Mountain Course 4 laps – 150.92 miles (242.80 km)
 For classic motor-cycles exceeding 351 cc and not exceeding 500 cc

Fastest Lap: Ollie Linsdell – 111.660 mph (20 minutes 16.446 secs)

Race 2a; 350 cc Junior Classic TT Race
Monday 26 August 2013 Mountain Course 4 laps – 150.92 miles (242.80 km)
 For motor-cycles exceeding 300 cc and not exceeding 351 cc

Fastest Lap; Chris Palmer 101.469 mph (22 minutes 18.469 secs)

Race 2b; 250 cc Lightweight Classic TT Race
Monday 26 August 2013 Mountain Course 4 laps – 150.92 miles (242.80 km)
 For motor-cycles exceeding 175 cc and not exceeding 250 cc

Fastest Lap; Ewan Hamilton 95.911 mph (23 minutes 36.186 secs)

Race 3a; Classic TT Formula 1 Superbike Race
Monday 26 August 2013 Mountain Course 4 laps – 150.92 miles (242.80 km)
 Class A
 Classic Machines 601 cc–1050 cc Four-stroke motorcycles.
 351 cc–750 cc Two-stroke motorcycles.

Fastest Lap; Michael Dunlop 123.6780 mph (18 minutes 18.236 secs)

Race 3b; Classic TT Formula 2 Race
Monday 26 August 2013 Mountain Course 4 laps – 150.92 miles (242.80 km)
 126 cc–250 cc Two-stroke Cylinder Grand Prix/Factory Standard motor-cycles/steel-frame or period aluminium.
 251 cc–350 cc Two-stroke Cylinder standard motor-cycles/steel-frame.
 Up to 600 cc Four-stroke Cylinder motorcycles.
 For motorcycles exceeding 175 cc and not exceeding 250 cc

Fastest Lap; James Cowton 111.872 mph (20 minutes 14.142 secs)

Race 4a; Newcomers Race 'A'
Wednesday 28 August 2013 Mountain Course 4 laps – 150.92 miles (242.80 km)
 Class A
 550 cc–750 cc Four-stroke Four-cylinder motor-cycles.
 651 cc–1000 cc Four-stroke Twin-cylinder motor-cycles.
 601 cc–675 cc Four-stroke Three-cylinder motor-cycles.
 601 cc–1000 cc Rotary motorcycles.

Fastest Lap: Connor Behan – 115.139 mph (19' 39.687)

Race 5; Junior Manx Grand Prix
Wednesday 28 August 2013 Mountain Course 4 laps – 150.92 miles (242.80 km)
 201 cc–250 cc Two-stroke Two-cylinder motor-cycles.
 550 cc–600 cc Four-stroke Four-cylinder motor-cycles.
 601 cc–675 cc Four-stroke Three-cylinder motor-cycles.
 651 cc–750 cc Four-stroke Two-cylinder motor-cycles.

Fastest Lap; James Cowton 119.659 mph (18 minutes 55.123 secs)

Race 6a; Super-Twin Race
Friday 30 August 2012 Mountain Course 2 laps – 75.46 miles (121.40 km) Reduced Race Distance.
 For motor-cycles exceeding 201 cc and not exceeding 650 cc Two-stroke Twin-cylinder motor-cycles

Fastest Lap: Michael Sweeney – 108.163 mph (20 minutes 55.767 secs)

Gallery

Sources

Manx Grand Prix
Manx
Manx Grand Prix
Manx Grand Prix